Alpine bulrush or cotton deergrass (Trichophorum alpinum) is a species of flowering plant in the sedge family. It has a circumboreal distribution, occurring throughout the northern latitudes of the Northern Hemisphere. It is present in Europe, Asia, and northern North America.

The leaves are no more than a centimeter long. The flowers have cottony white bristles that may extend  past the spikelet.

This plant grows in bogs and calcareous mountain meadows.

References

External links
The Nature Conservancy

alpinum
Plants described in 1753
Taxa named by Carl Linnaeus